Craig Cooper may refer to:

Craig B. Cooper, American aquanaut
Craig Cooper (badminton) (born 1981), badminton player from New Zealand
Craig Cooper (baseball), player for 1986 College Baseball All-America Team 
Craig Cooper from K.C. Undercover